Tim Euhus (born October 2, 1980 in Eugene, Oregon) is a former American football tight end. He was originally drafted by the Buffalo Bills in the fourth round of the 2004 NFL Draft. He played college football at Oregon State.

College career
Euhus attended Oregon State University, lettering in football all of his four years, and graduating with a degree in Construction Engineering Management.  He finished his career with 98 receptions for 1,346 yards (13.7 yards per rec. avg.) and nine touchdowns. He was also on the OSU basketball team as a freshman.

In 2003, he was a first-team All Pac-10 selection.

Professional career
Euhus was drafted in the fourth round of the 2004 NFL Draft by the Buffalo Bills.  During his rookie season, he started in five games, recording 11 receptions for 98 yards and two touchdowns.  In 2005 he appeared in 11 games recording 3 receptions for 17 yards.

He was traded to the Saints on June 6, 2006. Euhus was waived by the Saints (August 28, 2006) and claimed on waivers by the Pittsburgh Steelers (August 29, 2006).  He was waived by the Steelers (October 10, 2006). They re-signed him to a one-year deal in the offseason (February 15, 2007). On May 4, 2007 they released him. On May 29, 2007, he signed with the Cardinals and was later cut on November 27, 2007.  He was picked up two weeks later and finished his career with the Cardinals.

For a while, Euhus was a graduate assistant coach at Oregon State as of spring, 2008.  Most recently, he has joined a local investment firm as a financial advisor.

References

External links
Arizona Cardinals bio

1980 births
Living people
Sportspeople from Eugene, Oregon
American football tight ends
Oregon State Beavers football players
Buffalo Bills players
New Orleans Saints players
Pittsburgh Steelers players
Arizona Cardinals players